Aresti or Arestis is a surname. 
The name originates from Cyprus, Sardinia and Euskadi/ the Basque Country . Arestis is both a first name and surname in Cyprus, related to the Ancient Greek name Orestes. Notable people with the surname include:

Alexandros Aresti (born 1983), Cypriot swimmer
Antonis Aresti (born 1983), Cypriot athlete and Paralympian
Christina Arestis British/ Cypriot ballerina with The Royal Ballet
Frank Aresti (born 1967), American guitarist and composer
Gabriel Aresti (1933–1975), Basque writer and poet
Georgios Aresti (born 1994), Cypriot footballer
Giovanni Battista Aresti de Dovara, Roman Catholic Archbishop of Aleppo
Professor Philip Arestis Cypriot economist and academic, Professor and Senior Emeritus Fellow at the Cambridge Centre for Economics and Public Policy, Department of Land Economy, University of Cambridge, UK
Simone Aresti (born 1986), Sardinian footballer

See also
Aresti Catalog, is the Fédération Aéronautique Internationale (FAI) standards document enumerating the aerobatic manoeuvers permitted in aerobatic competition

References